Bhagyanagar is a village in Shorapur (Surpur) taluka, Yadgir district, Karnataka, India.

Demographics
At the 2001 census, Bhagyanagar had 630 inhabitants, 54 males and 276 females.

Notes

External links 
 

Villages in Yadgir district